Moises R. Espinosa Airport (Filipino: Paliparang Moises R. Espinosa, Masbateño: Palupadan san Moises R. Espinosa, Bikol: Palayugan nin Moises R. Espinosa), also known as Masbate Airport , is the airport serving the general area of Masbate City, located in the province of Masbate in the Philippines. It is named for Moises R. Espinosa Sr., a former Representative of Masbate who was assassinated at the airport on March 17, 1989.

The airport is classified as a Class 2 principal (minor domestic) airport by the Civil Aviation Authority of the Philippines, a body of the Department of Transportation that is responsible for the operations of not only this airport but also of all other airports in the Philippines except the major international airports.

Future expansion

Moises R. Espinosa Airport underwent a renovation of its runway and terminal building between 2006 and 2008. The Civil Aviation Authority of the Philippines plans to improve aviation facilities to become an airport that will welcome tourism in the province.

Incidents and accidents
On January 2, 2008, Asian Spirit Flight 321, an NAMC YS-11 on a flight from Manila, overshot Runway 21 of the airport at 7:30 a.m. while landing, collapsing the right main landing gear and damaging the starboard engine. None of the 47 passengers and crew on board were seriously injured.
On August 18, 2012, a chartered Piper PA-34 Seneca crashed at sea around  short of the runway. The aircraft was carrying Jesse Robredo, the Secretary of the Interior and Local Government, his aide and two pilots. The flight, originating from Cebu, was bound for Naga, Camarines Sur when its crew declared an emergency and requested priority landing at the airport. Robredo and the two pilots died in the crash, while his aide was rescued with only minor injuries.

Airlines and destinations

Gallery

See also
List of airports in the Philippines

References

External links

Airports in the Philippines
Buildings and structures in Masbate